Allan Darling Cuthbertson (7 April 1920 – 8 February 1988) was an Australian-born British actor. He was best known for playing stern-faced military officers in British films of the 1950s and 1960s.

Early life
Cuthbertson was born in Perth, Western Australia, son of Ernest and Isobel Ferguson (Darling) Cuthbertson. He performed on stage and radio from an early age.

During the Second World War he served as a flight lieutenant with the RAAF from 6 December 1941 to 1 July 1947, including service with 111 Air Sea Rescue Flight.

Career
Cuthbertson arrived in Britain in 1947, and appeared shortly thereafter as Romeo in Romeo and Juliet at the Boltons. In London's West End, he appeared as Laertes in Hamlet, Aimwell in The Beaux Stratagem, and Octavius Robinson in Man and Superman, among many other roles.

He was often cast in military roles, which was quite common in actors of his generation, especially those with a military air about them. He was Captain Eric Simpson in Tunes of Glory (1960) as well as being cast as more stuffy regimental types in such films as The Guns of Navarone (1961) and Carrington V.C. (1954), which also starred David Niven. He also made a brief appearance as a harassed staff officer, who then gets blown up, at the beginning of Ice Cold in Alex (1958). In 1962 he played a school teacher in Term of Trial with Laurence Olivier. He appeared four times in the television series The Avengers.

Cuthbertson also had a talent for playing comedy, which led to his best known role, although again playing a mustachioed military character, as Colonel Hall in the "Gourmet Night" episode of the hit sitcom Fawlty Towers in 1975. He appeared in many roles on British television, including with Tommy Cooper, Dick Emery and Frankie Howerd, and in All Gas and Gaiters, Gideon's Way episode The V Men (1964) as Chief Supt Bill Parsons and episode The Thin Red Line (1965) as Major Donald Ross, The Champions (1969 episode The Experiment as Cranmore), Danger Man, UFO (1970 episode "The Square Triangle"), an episode of The Persuaders! as Colonel Wright and Terry and June, where he played annoying neighbour Tarquin Spry. He was a regular guest on The Morecambe & Wise Show from 1973 to 1976. In the acclaimed 1985 Suspense Serial; Edge of Darkness, Allan played as Investigative Speaker Mr. Chilwell. One of his last TV appearances was in Michael Palin's East of Ipswich in 1987.

One of his last stage roles was in The Corn Is Green by Emlyn Williams at the Old Vic in 1985.

Personal life
Cuthbertson was long married to Dr Gertrude Willner, a refugee from Nazi-occupied Czechoslovakia, who had been a lawyer originally, but became a teacher in Britain. They had an adopted son.

At the time of his death, Cuthbertson was living in Surbiton, Greater London.

Filmography

 Carrington V.C. (1954) – Lt. Col. Henniker
 Portrait of Alison (1955) – Henry Carmichael
 On Such a Night (1956) – 1st Gentleman
 Doublecross (1956) – Clifford
 Cloak Without Dagger (1956) – Colonel Packham
 The Man Who Never Was (1956) – Vice-Admiral
 Eyewitness (1956) – Det Insp (uncredited)
 Anastasia (1956) – Blond Man (uncredited)
 The Passionate Stranger (1957) – Dr. Stevenson
 Yangtse Incident: The Story of H.M.S. Amethyst (1957) – Captain Donaldson RN
 Barnacle Bill (1957) – Chailey
 Law and Disorder (1958) – Police Inspector
 Ice Cold in Alex (1958) – Brigadier's Staff Officer
 I Was Monty's Double (1958) – Guards Officer
 Room at the Top (1959) – George Aisgill
 The Crowning Touch (1959) – Philip
 Shake Hands with the Devil (1959) – Captain
 The Devil's Disciple (1959) – British Captain
 Killers of Kilimanjaro (1959) – Sexton
 North West Frontier (1959) – Monocled Officer (uncredited)
 The Stranglers of Bombay (1960) – Capt. Christopher Connaught-Smith
 Tunes of Glory (1960) – Capt. Eric Simpson
 The Malpas Mystery (1960) – Lacey Marshalt
 Man at the Carlton Tower (1961)
 The Guns of Navarone (1961) – Maj. Baker
 On the Double (1961) – Captain Patterson
 Solo for Sparrow (1962) – Supt. Symington
 Term of Trial (1962) – Sylvan-Jones
 The Boys (1962) – Randolph St. John
 The Brain (1962) – Da Silva (uncredited)
 The Fast Lady (1962) – Bodley
 Freud: The Secret Passion (1962) – Wilkie

 Nine Hours to Rama (1963) – Capt. Goff
 The Running Man (1963) – Jenkins
 The Mouse on the Moon (1963) – Member of Whitehall Conference
 Tamahine (1963) – Housemaster
 Bitter Harvest (1963) – Mr. Eccles
 The Informers (1963) – Smythe
 The 7th Dawn (1964) – Colonel Cavendish
 Operation Crossbow (1965) – German Technical Examiner
 Life at the Top (1965) – George Aisgill
 Game for Three Losers (1965) – Garsden
 Cast a Giant Shadow (1966) – Immigration Officer
 Press for Time (1966) – Mr. Ballard
 The Trygon Factor (1966) – Det. Thompson
 Jules Verne's Rocket to the Moon (1967) – Scuttling
 Half a Sixpence (1967) – Wilkins
 Sinful Davey (1969) – Captain Douglas
 The Body Stealers (1969) – Hindesmith
 Captain Nemo and the Underwater City (1969) – Lomax
 The Adventurers (1970) – Hugh
 One More Time (1970) – Belton
 Performance (1970) – The Lawyer
 The Firechasers (1971) –  D.O Jarvis
 Assault (1971) – Coroner
 Diamonds on Wheels (1974) – Gus Ashley
 Fawlty Towers, episode "Gourmet Night" (1975) – Colonel Hall
 The Outsider (1979) – Stanley
 The Sea Wolves (1980) – Melborne
 Hopscotch (1980) – Chartermain
 The Mirror Crack'd (1980) – Peter Montrose ('Murder at Midnight')
 The Winds of War (miniseries), episodes "Cataclysm" & "The Changing of the Guard" (1983) – Maj. Gen. Tillet
 Thirteen at Dinner (1985) – Sir Montague Corner

References

External links
 
 Allan Cuthbertson Biography (1920–1988)

1920 births
1988 deaths
20th-century Australian male actors
20th-century English male actors
Australian emigrants to the United Kingdom
Australian male film actors
Australian male television actors
Male actors from Perth, Western Australia
Naturalised citizens of the United Kingdom
People from Surbiton
Royal Australian Air Force officers
Royal Australian Air Force personnel of World War II